Turn You On is the seventh studio album by garage rock band The Original Sins, which was independently released in 1995 through there very own Bedlam Records imprint, a label John Terlesky uses to release his solo material. The album was only ever released as a limited edition vinyl, with its artwork screen printed by hand.

During an interview session, John Terlesky called the album his favorite release by The Original Sins. He also mentioned the possibility of reissuing the record some time after the band's breakup, which would have included live recordings as bonus tracks, but the reissue has yet to see the light of day.

Track listing

Personnel
John Terlesky - Vocals, guitar, production
Ken Bussiere - Bass, backing vocals
Dan McKinney - Organ
Seth Baer - Drums, percussion, background vocals
Maria Stoiancheff - Vocals on "O Misery"
Adam Lasus - Recording

References

1995 albums
The Original Sins albums